Events from the year 1771 in Denmark.

Incumbents
 Monarch – Christian VII
 Prime minister – Johann Friedrich Struensee

Events
 January - Mathildeordenen is created.

Undated
The Royal Theatre Ballet School in Copenhagen is founded.

Births
 May 24 – Prince Frederik of Hesse, nobleman, general and governor (died 1845)
 July 7 – Princess Louise Auguste, princess of Denmark, Duches of Augustenborg (died 1843)

Deaths

References

 
1770s in Denmark
Denmark
Years of the 18th century in Denmark